Eupithecia scortillata is a moth in the family Geometridae. It is found in Iran and Kyrgyzstan.

References

Moths described in 1904
scortillata
Moths of the Middle East